Steve Lacy (born Steven Norman Lackritz; July 23, 1934 – June 4, 2004) was an American jazz saxophonist and composer recognized as one of the important players of soprano saxophone. Coming to prominence in the 1950s as a  progressive dixieland musician, Lacy went on to a long and prolific career. He worked extensively in experimental jazz and to a lesser extent in free improvisation, but Lacy's music was typically melodic and tightly-structured. Lacy also became a highly distinctive composer, with compositions often built out of little more than a single questioning phrase, repeated several times.

The music of Thelonious Monk became a permanent part of Lacy's repertoire after a stint in the pianist's band, with Monk's works appearing on virtually every Lacy album and concert program; Lacy often partnered with trombonist Roswell Rudd in exploring Monk's work. Beyond Monk, Lacy performed the work of jazz composers such as Charles Mingus, Duke Ellington and Herbie Nichols; unlike many jazz musicians he rarely played standard popular or show tunes.

Early life and career
Lacy began his career at sixteen playing Dixieland music with much older musicians such as Henry "Red" Allen, Pee Wee Russell, George "Pops" Foster and Zutty Singleton and then with Kansas City jazz players like Buck Clayton, Dicky Wells, and Jimmy Rushing. He then became involved with the avant-garde, performing on Jazz Advance (1956), the debut album of Cecil Taylor, and appearing with Taylor's groundbreaking quartet at the 1957 Newport Jazz Festival; he also made a notable appearance on an early Gil Evans album. His most enduring relationship, however, was with the music of Thelonious Monk: he recorded the first album to feature only Monk compositions (Reflections, Prestige, 1958) and briefly played in Monk's band in 1960 and later on Monk's Big Band and Quartet in Concert album (Columbia, 1963).

Europe and sextet
Lacy's first visit to Europe came in 1965, with a visit to Copenhagen in the company of Kenny Drew; he went to Italy and formed a quartet with Italian trumpeter Enrico Rava and the South African musicians Johnny Dyani and Louis Moholo (their visit to Buenos Aires is documented on The Forest and the Zoo, ESP, 1967). After a brief return to New York, he returned to Italy, then in 1970 moved to Paris, where he lived until the last two years of his life. He became a widely respected figure on the European jazz scene, though he remained less well known in the U.S.

The core of Lacy's activities from the 1970s to the 1990s was his sextet: his wife, singer/violinist Irene Aebi, soprano/alto saxophonist Steve Potts, pianist Bobby Few, bassist Jean-Jacques Avenel, and drummer Oliver Johnson (later John Betsch). Sometimes this group was scaled up to a large ensemble (e.g. Vespers, Soul Note, 1993, which added Ricky Ford on tenor sax and Tom Varner on French horn), sometimes pared down to a quartet, trio, or even a two-saxophone duo. He played duos with pianist Eric Watson. Lacy also, beginning in the 1970s, became a specialist in solo saxophone; he ranks with Sonny Rollins, Anthony Braxton, Evan Parker, and Lol Coxhill in the development of this demanding form of improvisation.

Lacy was interested in all the arts: the visual arts and poetry in particular became important sources for him. Collaborating with painters and dancers in multimedia projects, he made musical settings of his favourite writers: Robert Creeley, Samuel Beckett, Tom Raworth, Taslima Nasrin, Herman Melville, Brion Gysin and other Beat writers, including settings for the Tao Te Ching and haiku poetry. As Creeley noted in the Poetry Project Newsletter, "There's no way simply to make clear how particular Steve Lacy was to poets or how much he can now teach them by fact of his own practice and example. No one was ever more generous or perceptive."

Later career
In 1992, he was the recipient of a MacArthur Fellowship (nicknamed the "genius grant").

He also collaborated with a wide range of musicians, from traditional jazz to the avant-garde to contemporary classical music. Outside of his regular sextet, his most regular collaborator was pianist Mal Waldron, with whom he recorded a number of duet albums (notably Sempre Amore, a collection of Ellington/Strayhorn material, Soul Note, 1987).

Lacy played his 'farewell concerts to Europe' in Belgium, in duo and solo, for a small but motivated public. This happened in Brussels, Antwerp, Ghent, Bruges and Mons. In duo he played with Fred Van Hove, Joëlle Léandre, Mikhail Bezverkhni, Irène Aebi, Frederic Rzewski, Christopher Culpo and the dancer Shiro Daimon. This recollection is published by Naked Music, Afkikker, Ghent. In Ghent he played with the classical violinist Mikhail Bezverkhni, winner of Queen Elisabeth Concours. Two of these concerts were organized by Rita De Vuyst, his last muse in Europe, to whom he dedicated his solo CD Mother Goose solo @ afkikker. This CD is published within the book, Bone, a tribute to Lacy. He returned to the United States in 2002, where he began teaching at the New England Conservatory of Music in Boston, Massachusetts. One of his last public performances was in front of 25,000 people at the close of a peace rally on Boston Common in March 2003, shortly before the US-led invasion of Iraq.

After Lacy was diagnosed with liver cancer in August 2003, he continued playing and teaching until weeks before his death on June 4, 2004, at the age of 69.

Discography

As leader/co-leader

 Soprano Sax (Prestige, 1957)
 Reflections (Prestige, 1959) – recorded in 1958
 The Straight Horn of Steve Lacy (Candid, 1961) – recorded in 1960
 Evidence (New Jazz, 1962) – recorded in 1961
 Disposability (Vik, 1965)
 Jazz Realities (Fontana, 1966) with Carla Bley and Michael Mantler
 Sortie (GTA, 1966)

 The Forest and the Zoo (ESP-Disk, 1967) – recorded in 1966
 Roba, as Steve Lacy Gang (Saravah, 1969)
 Moon (BYG Actuel, 1969)
 Epistrophy (BYG Actuel, 1969)

 Wordless (Futura, 1971)
 Lapis (Saravah, 1971)
 The Gap (America, 1972)
 Live in Lisbon: Estilhacos (Guilda Da Música, 1972)
 Flaps, with Franz Koglmann (Pipe, 1973)
 Solo - Théâtre Du Chêne Noir (Emanem, 1974) – recorded in 1972
 Weal & Woe (Emanem, 1974) – recorded in 1972-73
 Scraps (Saravah, 1974)
 Flakes (RCA, 1974)
 Saxophone Special (Emanem, 1974)
 School Days with Roswell Rudd (Emanem, 1975) – recorded in 1963
 The Crust (Emanem, 1975) – recorded in 1973
 Straws (strange days, 1975)
 Dreams (Saravah, 1975)
 Stalks (Nippon Columbia, 1975)
 Solo at Mandara (ALM, 1975)
 Axieme (Red, 1975)
 Stabs (FMP, 1975)
 Clangs, with Andrea Centazzo (Ictus, 1976)
 Trickles (Black Saint, 1976)
 Sidelines (1977, Improvising Artists)
 Company, vol. 4, with Derek Bailey (1976)
 Trio Live (Ictus, 1976)
 Distant Voices with Masayuki Takayanagi and Takehisa Kosugi (Nippon Columbia, 1976) – recorded in 1975
 The Wire (Denon Jazz, 1977) – recorded in 1975
 Raps (Adelphi, 1977)
 Threads (1977, Horo)
 Catch (Horo, 1977)
 The Owl (Saravah, 1977)
 Shots (Musica, 1977)
 Lumps, with Michel Waisvisz, Han Bennink, Maarten van Regteren Altena (Instant Composers Pool, 1978) – recorded in 1974
 Follies (FMP, 1978) – recorded in 1977
 Clinkers (HatHut, 1978) – recorded in 1977-78
 Stamps (HatHut, 1979) – recorded in 1977-78
 Points (Le Chant Du Monde, 1978)
 Crops & The Woe (Quark Records & Books, 1979) – recorded in 1973-76
 Torments (Morgue, 1979) – recorded in 1975
 Eronel (1979, Horo) 
 Troubles (Black Saint, 1979)
 Duet, with Walter Zuber Armstrong (World Artists, 1979)
 The Way (hat Hut, 1980) – recorded in 1979
 Call Notes, with Walter Zuber Armstrong (World Artists, 1980) – recorded in 1979
 Capers (hat Hut, 1981) - also released as N.Y.Capers and N.Y. Capers & Quirks – recorded in 1979
 Tips (hat Hut, 1981)
 Songs (hat ART, 1981) with Brion Gysin
 Ballets (ha Hut, 1982)
 The Flame (Black Saint, 1982)
 Prospectus (hat ART, 1983) – recorded in 1982
 Regeneration, with Roswell Rudd, Misha Mengelberg et al. – (1983)
 Change of Season, with Misha Mengelberg, Han Bennink et al. –  (1984)
 Blinks (hat ART, 1984)
 Futurities (Hat Hut, 1985)
 The Condor (Soul Note, 1986) – recorded in 1985
 Chirps (FMP, 1986) – recorded in 1985
 Outings (Ismez, 1986)
 Hocus-Pocus (Les Disques Du Crépuscule, 1986)
 Solo (Egg Farm, 1986)
 Deadline (Sound Aspects, 1987) with Ulrich Gumpert – recorded in 1985
 Only Monk (Soul Note, 1987) – recorded in 1985

 The Kiss (Lunatic, 1987)
 One Fell Swoop (Silkheart, 1987)
 The Gleam (Silkheart, 1987)
 Dutch Masters, with Misha Mengelberg, Han Bennink, George E. Lewis, Ernst Reijseger (1987)
 Explorations, with Subroto Roy Chowdury (Jazzpoint, 1987)
 Momentum (RCA Novus, 1987)
 The Window (RCA Novus, 1988) – recorded in 1987
 Live in Budapest (West Wind, 1988) with Steve Potts – recorded in 1987
 Image (Ah Um, 1989) – recorded in 1987
 The Amiens Concert (Amiens, 1987) with Eric Watson and John Lindberg 
 Paris Blues with Gil Evans (Owl, 1987)
 The Door (RCA Novus, 1989)

 Morning Joy (hat ART, 1990) – recorded in 1986
 Anthem (RCA Novus, 1990)
 Rushes: Ten Songs from Russia (New Sound Planet, 1990)
 Steve Lacy Solo (In Situ, 1991) – recorded in 1985
 Flim-Flam (hat ART, 1991) with Steve Potts – recorded in 1986
 More Monk (Soul Note, 1991) – recorded in 1989
 Itinerary (hat ART, 1991)
 Remains (hat ART, 1992)
 Live at Sweet Basil (RCA Novus, 1992)
 Spirit of Mingus (Freelance, 1992) 
 Clangs (hat ART, 1993)
 We See (hat ART, 1993)
 Revenue (Soul Note, 1993)
 Vespers (Soul Note, 1993)
 Three Blokes (FMP, 1994) with Evan Parker and Lol Coxhill – recorded in 1992
 The Rendezvous (Exit, 1995) with Barry Wedgle – recorded in 1994
 Packet (New Albion, 1995) with Irene Aebi, Frederic Rzewski
 Actuality (Cavity Search, 1995)
 Eternal Duo '95 (Take One, 1996) with Masahiko Togashi – recorded in 1995
 Blues for Aida (Egg Farm, 1996) – recorded in 1995
 Bye-Ya (Freelance, 1996)
 Five Facings (FMP, 1996)
 5 x Monk 5 x Lacy (Silkheart, 1997)
 Live at Unity Temple (Wobbly Rail, 1998) – recorded in 1997
 The Rent (Cavity Search, 1999) – recorded in 1997
 Sands (Tzadik, 1998)
 The Joan Miró Foundation Concert (Nova Era, 1999) with Irene Aebi – recorded in 1995
 The Cry (Soul Note, 1999) – recorded in 1988

 Hooky (Emanem, 2000) – recorded in 1976
 Monk's Dream (Verve, 2000) – recorded in 1999
 Snips (2000)
 Opium, with Bill Dixon, Franz Koglmann (Between The Lines, 2001) – recorded in 1973-76; compiles tracks from the Koglmann/Lacy album Flaps (Pipe, 1973) and the Koglmann/Dixon album Opium for Franz (Pipe, 1977)
 Best Wishes: Live At The Labirinti Sonori Festival 2001 (Labirinti Sonori, 2001)
 10 of Dukes & 6 Originals (Senators, 2002) – recorded in 2000
 Apices (Studio Songs, 2002) with Masahiko Togashi and Masahiko Satoh – recorded in 2000
 The Holy La (Free Lance, 2002) – recorded in 1998 & 2001
 Mother Goose, solo@afkikker in Bone: a tribute to Steve Lacy (Gent, 2003) - CD attached in book. recorded in 2001.
 Materioso (Monk's Moods) (Onyx JazzClub, 2003) – recorded in 2001
 The Beat Suite (Universal Music Jazz France, 2003)
 Work (Sawano, 2003) with Anthony Cox、Daniel Humair – recorded in 2002
 New Jazz Meeting Baden-Baden 2002 (hatOLOGY, 2003) – recorded in 2002
 The Complete Whitey Mitchell Sessions (Lone Hill Jazz, 2004) – recorded in 1956
 Leaves Blossoms (Naked Music, 2005) – recorded in 2002
 One More Time (Leo, 2005) with Joëlle Léandre – recorded in 2002
 Tao with Andrea Centazzo (Ictus, 2006) – recorded in 1976-84
 Early and Late, with Roswell Rudd (Cuneiform,  2007) – recorded in 1962, 1999, 2002
 November (Intakt, 2010) – recorded in 2003
 Last Tour (Emanem, 2015) – recorded in 2004

Compilations

 Scratching the Seventies/Dreams (Saravah, 1996) 
 Associates (Musica Jazz, 1996)
 The Sun (Emanem, 2012)
 Avignon And After Volume 1 (Emanem, 2012)
 Avignon And After Volume 2 (Emanem, 2014)

 Blossoms, farewell concerts to Europe, Naked Music, Afkikker

With Mal Waldron

 Journey Without End (RCA Victor, 1971)
 Mal Waldron with the Steve Lacy Quintet (America, 1972)
 Hard Talk (Enja, 1974)
 One-Upmanship (Enja, 1977)
 Moods (Enja, 1978)
 Sempre Amore (Soul Note, 1987) – recorded in 1986
 The Super Quartet Live at Sweet Basil (Paddle Wheel, 1987)
 Hot House (RCA Novus, 1991) – recorded in 1990
 I Remember Thelonious (Nel Jazz, 1996) – recorded in 1992
 Let's Call This... Esteem (1993)
  Communiqué (1997)
 One More Time (2002)
 Live at Dreher, Paris 1981 (hatOLOGY, 2003) – compilation
 Live at Dreher, Paris 1981, Round Midnight Vol. 1 (hat ART, 1996)
 Live at Dreher, Paris 1981, The Peak Vol. 2 (hat ART, 1996)
 Japan Dream (2004)
 At the Bimhuis 1982 (2006)

As sideman

 Dick Sutton – Jazz Idiom (1954)
 Dick Sutton Sextet – Progressive Dixieland (1954)
 Tom Stewart – Quintet/Sextet (1956)
 Whitey Mitchell Sextette – Whitey Mitchell Sextette (1956)
 Joe Puma – Modern Jazz Sampler (1956)
 Cecil Taylor – Jazz Advance (1956)
 Gil Evans – Gil Evans & Ten (1957)
 Cecil Taylor – At Newport (1958)
 Gil Evans – Great Jazz Standards (1959)
 Miles Davis – At Carnegie Hall (1961)
 Miles Davis – Quiet Nights (1963)
 Thelonious Monk – Big Band and Quartet in Concert (1964)
 Bobby Hackett – Hello Louis (1964)
 Gil Evans – The Individualism of Gil Evans (1964)
 Kenny Burrell – Guitar Forms (1965)
 Jazz Composers Orchestra – Communication (1965)
 Giorgio Gaslini – Nuovi Sentimenti (1966)
 Gary Burton – A Genuine Tong Funeral (1967)
 Max Roach – Sounds as a Roach (1968)
 Giorgio Gaslini – Il Grido: Big Band Live (1968)
 Giovanni Tommaso – Indefinitive Atmosphere (1969)
 Giovanni Tommaso – The Healthy Food Band (1970)
 Alan Silva – Seasons (1970)
 Giorgio Gaslini & Jean-Luc Ponty – Fabbrica Occupata (1973)
 Maria Monti – Il Bestiario (1974)
 Globe Unity Special – Evidence, vol.1 (1975)
 Globe Unity Special – Into the Valley, vol.2 (1975)
 Roswell Rudd – Blown Bone (1976)
 Area – Maledetti (1976)
 Area – Event '76 (1976)
 Musica Elettronica Viva – United Patchwork (Horo, 1977)
 Kenny Davern – Unexpected (Kharma, 1978)
 Gil Evans – Parabola (Horo, 1979)
 Laboratorio della Quercia – Laboratorio della Quercia del Tasso (Horo, 1978)
 Globe Unity Orchestra – Compositions ((Japo, 1980)
 V.A. – Amarcord Nino Rota (Corbett Vs. Dempsey, 1980)
 Tiziana Ghiglioni – Somebody Special (Soul Note, 1986)
 Company – Company, vol. 5, 6, 7 (Incus, 1991) – recorded in 1977
 V.A. – Interpretations Of Monk (DIW, 1994) – recorded in 1981
 Roswell Rudd – Broad Strokes'' (Knitting Factory, 2000)

References

External links

 Discography

1934 births
2004 deaths
MacArthur Fellows
Avant-garde jazz musicians
Dixieland jazz musicians
American jazz soprano saxophonists
American male saxophonists
Jazz soprano saxophonists
Deaths from cancer in Massachusetts
Candid Records artists
BYG Actuel artists
ESP-Disk artists
Novus Records artists
Verve Records artists
Tzadik Records artists
Prestige Records artists
RCA Records artists
Cavity Search Records artists
20th-century American musicians
20th-century saxophonists
American male jazz musicians
Globe Unity Orchestra members
Black Lion Records artists
Improvising Artists Records artists
FMP/Free Music Production artists
Sunnyside Records artists
20th-century American male musicians
Intakt Records artists
Jewish jazz musicians
Emanem Records artists
Fontana Records artists
Label Bleu artists
Silkheart Records artists
Leo Records artists